Stefan Velkov (born 12 December 1996) is a Bulgarian professional footballer who plays as a defender for Danish club Vejle.

Career

Slavia Sofia
Born in Sofia, Velkov began his football career with Slavia Sofia in 2005. He made his first-team debut on 27 July 2013, at 16 years 227 days, coming on as a substitute for Hristo Yanev in a 0–0 away league draw against Cherno More Varna. On 18 December 2013, it was reported that Velkov was on trial with Manchester United. After the great debut season and a few trials in big European teams, Velkov got a serious injury, which took him out of football for a minimum of six months.

In March 2015, Velkov extended his contract with Slavia for a further three years. He returned to training in April, but he did not take part in any further matches, so he missed the entire 2014–15 season.

Velkov returned to play in the first match of the 2015–16 season against Lokomotiv Plovdiv as a substitute in the 88th minute.

Velkov scored his debut goal for Slavia in the league on 17 September 2016 in a match against Ludogorets Razgrad, lost by his team with 3–1.

Den Bosch
On 10 August 2018, Velkov signed for the Dutch Eerste Divisie team Den Bosch. He made his debut a week later, playing the full 90 minutes in a 2–1 away win over FC Volendam. He scored his first goal for the club on 25 September, in a 2–1 loss against Heracles Almelo in the KNVB Cup.

MSV Duisburg
After a short stint at KFC Uerdingen he moved to MSV Duisburg in January 2021. He signed a new one-year contract on 27 May 2021. In the summer of 2022, he left Duisburg.

Vejle
On 17 June 2022, Velkov signed with newly relegated Danish 1st Division side Vejle Boldklub, penning a deal until June 2024.

International career

Youth levels
Velkov represented Bulgaria at the under-16, under-17 and under-19 levels. On 1 June 2013, he made his debut for the Bulgaria under-21 side at the age of 16 years, 5 months and 22 days, making him the second-youngest player to debut for the team after Nikolay Mihaylov. On 25 March 2016 Velkov was in the starting lineup for the goalless draw with Wales U21. He is currently the team captain.

Senior level
On 14 March 2017, he received his first call-up for Bulgaria senior team for the match against the Netherlands on 25 March 2017, in which he was an unused substitute. Velkov earned his first cap on 26 February 2020, playing the first 75 minutes of the 1–0 home loss against Belarus in a friendly game.

Career statistics

Club

International

Honours
Slavia Sofia
 Bulgarian Cup: 2017–18

References

External links

1996 births
Living people
Association football defenders
Bulgarian footballers
Bulgaria youth international footballers
PFC Slavia Sofia players
FC Den Bosch players
RKC Waalwijk players
KFC Uerdingen 05 players
MSV Duisburg players
Vejle Boldklub players
First Professional Football League (Bulgaria) players
Eerste Divisie players
3. Liga players
Bulgarian expatriate footballers
Bulgarian expatriate sportspeople in the Netherlands
Expatriate footballers in the Netherlands
Bulgarian expatriate sportspeople in Germany
Expatriate footballers in Germany
Bulgarian expatriate sportspeople in Denmark
Expatriate men's footballers in Denmark